Dzhidinsky District (Zedyn aimag) is an administrative and municipal district (raion), one of the twenty-one in the Republic of Buryatia, Russia. It is located in the south of the republic. Its administrative center is the rural locality (a selo) of Petropavlovka. As of the 2010 Census, the total population of the district was 29,352, with the population of Petropavlovka accounting for 25.4% of that number.

Administrative and municipal status
Within the framework of administrative divisions, Dzhidinsky District is one of the twenty-one in the Republic of Buryatia. The district is divided into fifteen selsoviets and eight somons, which comprise thirty-eight rural localities. As a municipal division, the district is incorporated as Dzhidinsky Municipal District. Its fifteen selsoviets and eight somons are incorporated as twenty-two rural settlements within the municipal district. The selo of Petropavlovka serves as the administrative center of both the administrative and municipal district.

References

Notes

Sources

Districts of Buryatia
 
